Sir David Baird, 2nd Baronet, of Newbyth (1795 – 8 January 1852) was a British baronet and captain in the British army.

Life 
David Baird was born in 1795, the son of Robert Baird and Hersey Christina Maria Gavin. On 10 August 1821 he married Lady Anne Kennedy, daughter of Sir Archibald Kennedy, 1st Marquess of Ailsa and Margaret Erskine. Together they had ten children:

Alice Anne (d. 16 January 1908), married Rev. Hon. Arthur Charles Baillie-Hamilton, son of George Baillie-Hamilton, 10th Earl of Haddington. They had one daughter.
Robert Wynne (d. 15 October 1845).
Archibald (d. 15 October 1845)
Hersey Maria Christina Elizabeth (4 June 1908). Unmarried.
Margaret (c. 1831 – 24 March 1903), married Lord Gilbert Kennedy, son of Archibald Kennedy, Earl of Cassillis and had issue.
Sir David Baird, 3rd Baronet (26 January 1832 – 13 October 1913), who married the Hon. Ellen Stuart, daughter of Charles Stuart, 12th Lord Blantyre and Lady Evelyn Sutherland-Leveson-Gower (daughter of George Sutherland-Leveson-Gower, 2nd Duke of Sutherland). They had six children.
Adm. Sir John Erskine Kennedy KCB (16 September 1833 – 8 December 1908), married Constance Barbara Clarke, but died without issue.
Capt. William Arthur (b. 1839), served in the 42nd Highlanders. He fought in the Ashanti Wars, and died from wounds sustained in them. Unmarried.
Capt. Frederick (1841–1884), served as a lieutenant in the 6th Foot Regiment, and as a captain in the Haddington Militia. Unmarried.
Jonathan Peel (9 January 1844 – 22 April 1915), married Emily Diana Frances Maude, daughter of Col. Sir George Ashley Maude. They had nine children. He was JP of Lanarkshire.

Baird succeeded to the title of 2nd Baronet Baird, of Newbyth, county Haddington on 18 August 1829, on the death of his uncle Sir David Baird, 1st Baronet.

References
 [S37] Charles Mosley, editor, Burke's Peerage, Baronetage & Knightage, 107th ed., 3 vols. (Wilmington, Delaware, U.S.A.: Burke's Peerage (Genealogical Books) Ltd., 2003) vol. 1, p. 225.
 [S37] Charles Mosley, Burke's Peerage and Baronetage, 107th ed., vol. 1, p. 224.
 [S8] Charles Mosley, editor, Burke's Peerage and Baronetage, 106th edition, 2 vols. (Crans. Switzerland: Burke's Peerage (Genealogical Books) Ltd., 1999), vol. 1, p. 42.
 "Death of Sir David Baird". The Glasgow Herald. Friday, 9 January 1852. p. 5.

External links
 Lundy, Darryl, ed. (2019). "Person Page - 8978". The Peerage. Retrieved 22 May 2022.

1795 births
1852 deaths
Scots Guards officers
Baronets in the Baronetage of the United Kingdom